Konrád Burchard-Bélaváry (1837–1916), was a Hungarian Business magnate and diplomat.

Formed at the Berlin University of Commerce, he became CEO of the Gristmill of Pest (Pesti Hengermalom Társaság), vice-CEO and member of the board of directors of various companies :, Hotel Royal, National Union of Cooperatives of Credits, etc. Burchard-Bélaváry was the first major Hungarian industrialist to be appointed a life member of the House of Magnates, in 1885. He was also Consul general of Brazil in Budapest for fourteen years (1884–98). 
He was knight of the Order of Franz Joseph (1882) and of the Imperial Order of Leopold (1916). He was also a recipient of orders from Brazil, Spain and Belgium.

Konrád took over the education of his nephew , who was orphaned at the age of two. He is also himself a cousin of Józef Paczoski.

References

 Austro-Hungarian Almanach 1910–1915
 Biography on nevpont.hu
 A Magyar országgyülés, Jókai könyvnyomda, 1906
 József Szinnyei, Pál Gulyás : Magyar írók élete és munkái, Vol.4, Magyar Könyvtárosok et Levéltárosok Egyesülete, 1942

External links 
 The Business Strategy of Fathers and Sons: A Hungarian Family in the 19th and 20th Centuries, Judit Klement, 2005

1837 births
1916 deaths
19th-century Hungarian people
Hungarian economists
Hungarian politicians
Hungarian diplomats
Members of the House of Magnates
Recipients of the Order of Franz Joseph